Elling William Gollings (17 March 1878 – 16 April 1932) was an American painter who was born in Pierce City, Idaho. His works are displayed in American institutions such as the Gilcrease Museum in Oklahoma, the Buffalo Bill Historical Center in Cody, Wyoming, and the National Museum of Wildlife Art.

Illustrations by E. William Gollings for The Foreman of the J.A.6. by E. Joy Johnson

References

19th-century American painters
American male painters
20th-century American painters
1878 births
1932 deaths
19th-century American male artists
20th-century American male artists